Gottlieb Wilhelm Leitner (14 October 1840 – 22 March 1899), also known as Gottlieb William Leitner, was a British orientalist.

Early life and education
Gottlieb Wilhelm Leitner was born in Pest, Hungary, on 14 October 1840 to a Jewish family. His mother was Marie Henriette Herzberg. His father, Leopold Saphir, died when Gottlieb was young and his mother then married Johann Moritz Leitner. Gottlieb and his sister Elisabeth (the mother of British politician Leopold Amery) were thereafter known as Leitner.

As a child Leitner showed an extraordinary ability in languages. At the age of eight he went to Constantinople to learn Arabic and Turkish, and by the age of ten he was fluent in Turkish, Arabic and most European languages. At fifteen, he was appointed Interpreter (First Class) to the British Commissariat in the Crimea, with the rank of colonel. When the Crimean War ended, he wanted to become a priest and went to study at King's College London.

It is also reported that during his tour of Muslim countries he adopted a Muslim name of Abdur Rasheed Sayyah. Sayyah in Arabic means a traveller.

As a linguist, he is said to have had acquaintance with some fifty languages, many of which he spoke fluently. At nineteen, he became lecturer in Arabic, Turkish and Modern Greek, and at twenty-three was appointed Professor in Arabic and Muslim Law at King's College London.

Three years later, sometime in 1864, he became Principal of Government College University (Lahore) (then British India, present day Pakistan). He was instrumental in the foundation of the University of the Punjab in 1882. He took over as first Registrar of University of the Punjab. He founded many schools, literary associations, public libraries and academic journals, while at the same time dedicating himself to the study of the cultures of the Indian subcontinent. During this period he wrote a scholarly and comprehensive book in Urdu, History of Islam, in two volumes, with the help of an Urdu Muslim scholar, Maulvi Karim-ud-Din, who was at that time District Inspector of Schools in Amritsar, Punjab. These two volumes were later published in 1871 and 1876. Following the passage of the Royal Titles Act 1876 which declared Queen Victoria Empress of India, Prof. Leitner coined the title Kaysar-i-Hind as the new Empress' official title.

He retired from the Indian Civil Service in 1886.

Return to Europe
He returned to Europe in the late 1870s to pursue studies at Heidelberg University (Germany), and he also undertook work for the Austrian, Prussian, and British Governments. His ambition now was to found a centre for the study in Europe of Oriental languages, culture and history. On his return to England in 1881, he sought a suitable site for his proposed institution, and in 1883 came upon the vacant Royal Dramatic College in Woking, a building admirably suited for the purpose.

For the benefit of Muslim students, Leitner commissioned the construction of a mosque. The Shah Jahan Mosque was built in 1889 as one of the first mosques in Western Europe and the first purpose-built one in Britain, and survives to this day. It was built in Indo-Saracenic style, named after Sultan Shah Jahan, Begum of Bhopal (1868–1901).

Shah Jahan Begum made sizable donations towards the building of the mosque and also contributed generously towards the founding of the "Muhammadan Anglo-Oriental College" at Aligarh, which developed into the Aligarh Muslim University.

Inscription on the tomb of Dr G.W. Leitner

Dr. Leitner is buried at Brookwood Cemetery, near Woking.

Major works
 On the Sciences of language and of ethnography, with general reference to the language and customs of the people of Hanza: A report of an extempore address. (nach 1856).
 Introduction to a philosophical Grammar of Arabic: Being an attempt to discover a few simple principles in Arabic Grammar. Reprinted and slightly enlarged from the "Panjab Educational Magazine", Lahore 1871
 The Sinin-i-Islam; The races of Turkey; History of Dardistan, songs, legends etc.; Graeco-budhistic discoveries; History of indigenous education in the Panjab since annexation.
 A lecture on the races of Turkey, both of Europe and of Asia, and the state of their education: being, principally, a contribution to Muhammadan education. Lahore 1871.
A detailed analysis of Abdul Ghafur's dictionary of the terms used by criminal tribes in the Panjab. Lahore 1880.
 History of indigenous education in the Punjab since annexation and in 1882. Calcutta 1882. Reprint Delhi: Amar Prakashan, 1982.
 The Kunza and Nagyr handbook being an introduction to a Knowledge of the language. Calcutta 1889.
 Dardistan in 1866, 1886 and 1893: being an account of the history, religions, customs, legends, fables, and songs of Gilgit, Chilas, Kandia (Gabrial), Yasin, Chitral, Hunza, Aagyr, and other parts of the Hindukush, Reprint der Ausgabe Woking, Oriental Univ. Inst., 1893, New Delhi: Bhavana Books & Prints, 2001 
Dardistan in 1866, 1886 and 1893 : being an account of the history, religions, customs, legends, fables and songs of Gilgit Chilas, Kandia (Gabrial) Yasin, Chitral, Hunza, Nagyr and other parts of the Hindukush; as also a suppl. to the 2. ed. of The Hunza and Nagyr handbook and an epitome of p. 3 of the author's "The languages and races of Dardistan".  Reprint of the edition 1889, Karachi: Indus Publ., 1985.

References

 Oxford Dictionary of National Biography
 http://www.wokingmuslim.org/pers/dr_leitner.htm
 Muhammad Ikram Chaghatai: Writings of Dr. Leitner: Islam, education, Dardistan, politics and culture of Northern areas. Comp. by Muhammad Ikram Chaghatai. Lahore: Government College Research and Publ. Society; Sang-e-Meel Publ., 2002. 
 J. FL Stocqueler, Life and Labors of Dr Leitner (1875)
 "Portraits of Celebrities at Different Times of their Lives", The Strand Magazine, Volume VII, January–June 1894
 William Rubinstein, The secret of Leopold Amery, Historical Research, vol. 73, no. 181 (June 2000), 175–196.

External links
 Jewish Encyclopedia
 http://www.wokingmuslim.org/pers/dr_leitner.htm
 

19th-century Hungarian people
19th-century British people
Hungarian orientalists
British orientalists
Jewish orientalists
Hungarian Jews
British Jews
Academics of King's College London
Alumni of King's College London
Hungarian emigrants to England
Writers from Budapest
Burials at Brookwood Cemetery
1840 births
1899 deaths
British people of Hungarian-Jewish descent